Goodenia jaurdiensis is a species of flowering plant in the family Goodeniaceae and endemic to the south-west of Western Australia. It is an annual herb with egg-shaped to lance-shaped leaves with the narrower end towards the base, the leaves at the base of the plant, and racemes of yellow to orange flowers.

Description
Goodenia jaurdiensis is an annual herb that typically grows to a height of  but lacks a stem. The leaves are arranged in a rosette at the base of the plant and are egg-shaped to lance-shaped with the narrower end towards the base, and sometimes lobed. Flowering occurs from September to October, depending on rainfall.

Taxonomy and naming
Goodenia jaurdiensis was first formally described in 2007 by Leigh William Sage and Kelly Anne Shepherd in the journal Nuytsia from material collected by Sage on Jaurdi Station (north of Yellowdine) in 1999. The specific epithet (jaurdiensis) refers to the plant's growing near granite outcrops.

Distribution and habitat
This goodenia is only known from three populations on Jaurdi Station in the Coolgardie biogeographic region, where it grows on low-lying plains and lower slopes in low forest or low open woodland.

Conservation status
Goddenia jaurdiensis is classified as "Priority Two" by the Western Australian Government Department of Parks and Wildlife meaning that it is poorly known and from only one or a few locations.

References

jaurdiensis
Eudicots of Western Australia
Plants described in 2007
Taxa named by Kelly Anne Shepherd